The Bat Cave (Chameri Gufa in Nepali language) is a solutional cave in the Kaski District in Pokhara, Nepal. It is known for a habitat of Horseshoe bats inside the cave, over the walls and ceiling. The cave is formed of limestone. It is a show cave and one of the most popular tourist destinations in Pokhara.

Geography
The cave has one entrance and one exit. The exit is narrower than the entrance and needs climbing. The indigenous belief is that only those who have not sinned should pass the exit hole. The cave is surrounded by forest. It is close to the nearby Mahendra Cave. The cave is U-shaped and inside the cave are carvings of Hindu deities. Up to 18 species of bats appear in the cave during the winter months.

Gallery

See also
 Mahendra Cave, nearby cave
 List of caves in Nepal

Reference

External links
 Bat Cave on Showcaves.com

Caves of Nepal
Show caves
Limestone caves